George French Strother (1783November 28, 1840) was a nineteenth-century politician, lawyer and slaveowner in Virginia and Missouri.

Early life and education
Born in Stevensburg, Virginia, to prominent Culpeper County attorney French Strother (1739–1800) and his wife the former Lucy Coleman, George Strother attended the College of William and Mary.

Virginia political career

After studying law, George Strother too was admitted to the bar, and commenced practice in Culpeper County, Virginia. He inherited property (including slaves) when his father died in 1799. In the 1810 federal census, he owned 7 slaves in Culpeper County, and 23 slaves in Falmouth in Stafford County, Virginia, from here his father had moved to Culpeper County but where the family continued to retain property.

George Strother won what once had been his father's seat in the Virginia House of Delegates representing Culpeper County alongside  John Roberts (Culpeper) for three single-year terms, 1806–1809. In 1816, the year voters elected fellow Virginian James Monroe president, George Strother was elected to the United States House of Representatives as a Democratic-Republican, where he served from 1817 to 1820. He succeeded fellow Democratic Republican Aylett Hawes, who retired and returned to his medical practice (and whom he had succeeded in the Virginia House of Delegates in 1806). Strother won re-election in 1818 but resigned in February 1820, and his seat lay vacant until fellow Democratic Republican Thomas L. Moore was elected in November.

Missouri
After the Missouri Compromise led to Missouri's admission as a slave state, Strother moved to St. Louis, Missouri, where Strother became receiver of public money.

Strother practiced law in St. Louis for many years. A nephew with the same name caused a sensation by stabbing a fellow lawyer from Virginia named Horatio Cozens to death in the courthouse over a political dispute on behalf of this George Strother. The murderer then fled to Mexico, where he reportedly died.

Family
George French Strother married Sarah Green Williams, daughter of Gen. James Williams, of "Soldier's Rest" in Orange County, Virginia. The couple had two children: Sarah Williams Strother (1810–1885), James French Strother (1811–1860) (and grandfather of another named James French Strother who served in Virginia's Constitutional Convention of 1850). After Sarah died, Strother married Theodosia, daughter of John Hunt, of Lexington, Kentucky, and had two more children, Sallie and John Hunt Strother (1812–1863).

Death and legacy
George Strother died on November 28, 1840. He was originally interred in Christ Church Cemetery and in 1860 was reinterred in Bellefontaine Cemetery.

References

1783 births
1840 deaths
Members of the Virginia House of Delegates
Virginia lawyers
College of William & Mary alumni
Burials at Bellefontaine Cemetery
Strother family
People from Culpeper County, Virginia
Politicians from St. Louis
Democratic-Republican Party members of the United States House of Representatives from Virginia
19th-century American politicians